Dulaankhaan  is an urban-type settlement in the Shaamar sum (district) of Selenge Province in northern Mongolia. It is 35 km SE from Shaamar sum center,  50 km S (via Shaamar) from Selenge Province capital Sükhbaatar city. Dulaankhaan is 60 km N from Darkhan city (Darkhan-Uul Province center).

Dulankhaan population was 1,997 (1994).

Dulaankhaan has a station on the Trans-Mongolian Railway.

Populated places in Mongolia